The following events occurred in November 1937:

November 1, 1937 (Monday)
The Defense of Sihang Warehouse ended in Japanese victory.
Japanese troops advanced deeper into Shanghai by crossing Suzhou Creek.
Anna Marie Hahn took the stand in her own defense during her sensational murder trial in Cincinnati, Ohio. Hahn denied ever poisoning anyone with arsenic. 
Born: Bill Anderson, country musician and television personality, in Columbia, South Carolina
Died: Milan Gorkić, 33, Yugoslav communist leader (killed in the Great Purge)

November 2, 1937 (Tuesday)
The Howie Morenz Memorial Game was played as a benefit to raise money for the family of the late Montreal Canadiens star Howie Morenz. The National Hockey League All-Stars defeated the Canadiens 6–5.
Fiorello H. La Guardia easily won re-election as Mayor of New York City.
Born: Bharath Gopi, film actor, producer and director, in Chirayinkeezhu, British India (d. 2008)

November 3, 1937 (Wednesday)
The Nine Power Treaty Conference opened in Brussels to consider means of ending the war between Japan and China.
Ethiopian Crown Prince Asfaw Wossen petitioned the Coptic Church Council in Egypt for a divorce from Wolete Israel Seyoum, declaring that he could not live with the daughter of a man who surrendered to the Italian invaders.
Police in the Free City of Danzig seized Jewish bank deposits.

November 4, 1937 (Thursday)
Three men were executed by decapitation in Nazi Germany for high treason and espionage, including the former Communist deputy Robert Stamm.
Born: Loretta Swit, actress, in Passaic, New Jersey; Michael Wilson, politician, in Toronto, Ontario, Canada (d. 2019)
Died: Ghiță Moscu, 47 or 48, Romanian leftist activist (killed in the Great Purge); Robert Stamm, 37, German politician (executed)

November 5, 1937 (Friday)
The Duke of Windsor cancelled a visit to the United States the day before he was to set sail. A statement through the Anglo-American Press Association cited "grave misconceptions" about the purpose of the trip, which was due to take place with Charles Bedaux.
30,000 Japanese troops landed virtually unopposed at Hangzhou Bay.
Hossbach Memorandum: At a secret meeting in the Chancellory in Berlin, Hitler announced his plan for an expansionist foreign policy to secure Lebensraum by force.
Germany and Poland signed a joint declaration on minorities, guaranteeing proper reciprocal treatment and protection of the Polish minority in Germany and the German minority in Poland. 
Born: Chan Sek Keong, third Chief Justice of Singapore, in Ipoh, Federated Malay States; Harris Yulin, actor, in Los Angeles

November 6, 1937 (Saturday)
Italy joined Germany and Japan in the Anti-Comintern Pact.
The jury in the Anna Marie Hahn trial found her guilty of murder.
Born: Joe Warfield, actor, in Baltimore, Maryland
Died: Johnston Forbes-Robertson, 84, English actor and theatre manager

November 7, 1937 (Sunday)
1 million people paraded in Moscow on the 20th anniversary of the Revolution.

November 8, 1937 (Monday)
The Republic of China established the Order of National Glory.
The U.S. Supreme Court decided Bogardus v. Commissioner.
The degenerate art exhibition The Eternal Jew opened in Munich.
Born: Paul Foot, journalist, in Haifa, Mandatory Palestine (d. 2004)

November 9, 1937 (Tuesday)
The Battle of Taiyuan ended in Japanese victory.
The Japanese captured Shanghai.
Died: Ramsay MacDonald, 71, British statesman and first Labour Party Prime Minister of the United Kingdom

November 10, 1937 (Wednesday)
Brazilian President Getúlio Vargas promulgated a new Constitution giving himself dictatorial powers. Vargas cancelled the upcoming presidential elections.
Germany announced that all men born between 1893 and 1900 would be called up for medical inspection to assess their suitability to be drafted for military service.
Born: Zdeněk Zikán, footballer, in Prague, Czechoslovakia (d. 2013)

November 11, 1937 (Thursday)
The Battle of Xinkou ended in Japanese victory.
The British commissioner in Mandatory Palestine set up special military courts to try suspected terrorists. Anyone carrying unauthorized firearms, bombs or ammunition would be subject to the death penalty.
During Remembrance Day ceremonies at the Whitehall Cenotaph, an ex-serviceman who had escaped from a mental asylum interrupted the two minutes of silence by screaming "All this hypocrisy!" and something that sounded like "Preparing for war!" The police chased him down and silenced him, but the incident opened a dialogue in the British press about whether the annual tradition of the silence should continue.
Born: Stephen Lewis, politician and diplomat, in Ottawa, Ontario, Canada
Died: Uryū Sotokichi, 80, Japanese admiral

November 12, 1937 (Friday)
The memoir Out of Africa by Karen Blixen was published.
The crime film The Last Gangster starring Edward G. Robinson was released.

November 13, 1937 (Saturday)
The NBC Symphony Orchestra performed its first radio broadcast over NBC Radio.
Died: Mrs. Leslie Carter, 80, American actress; Ed Wutke, 35, American criminal (suicide)

November 14, 1937 (Sunday)
7 people were killed and several injured in clashes and bombings in Jerusalem.
U.S. President Franklin D. Roosevelt gave a fireside chat on the topic of the unemployment census.
Born: Murray Oliver, ice hockey player and coach, in Hamilton, Ontario, Canada (d. 2014)

November 15, 1937 (Monday)
The Nine Power Treaty Conference adopted a declaration condemning Japan. Only Italy voted against the motion.
A statue of Sun Yat-sen was unveiled in San Francisco, California at St. Mary's Square.
Born: Little Willie John, singer, in Cullendale, Arkansas (d. 1968)

November 16, 1937 (Tuesday)
A Junkers Ju 52 aircraft flying from Cologne to London crashed in Ostend, Belgium, killing all 11 aboard including the Duke and Duchess of Hesse.
USS Wichita was commissioned into service
British MPs voted to build air-raid shelters in most of Britain's towns and cities.
The British government announced the appointment of Robert Hodgson as agent to the Franco regime in Burgos. Although this fell short of diplomatic recognition, it was a form of de facto recognition that was a diplomatic coup for the Franco government.
Died: Princess Cecilie of Greece and Denmark, 26 (plane crash); Georg Donatus, Hereditary Grand Duke of Hesse, 31 (plane crash)

November 17, 1937 (Wednesday)
British cabinet minister Lord Halifax arrived in Germany for talks with Nazi officials.
Louis, Prince of Hesse and by Rhine married Margaret-Campbell Geddes, daughter of Auckland Geddes, in London. The bride wore black because of the previous day's plane crash deaths of the Duke and Duchess of Hesse and other relatives.
Born: Peter Cook, actor and comedian, in Torquay, Devon, England (d. 1995); Manuel Félix López, businessman and politician, in Junin, Ecuador (d. 2004)
Died: Jack Worrall, 76, Australian rules footballer

November 18, 1937 (Thursday)
French authorities uncovered a plot by La Cagoule to overthrow the government and restore the monarchy.

November 19, 1937 (Friday)
Chinese forces abandoned their defensive line at Suzhou.
George Eyston broke his own three-week-old land speed record, achieving 311.42 mph.
The musical comedy film A Damsel in Distress starring Fred Astaire, George Burns and Gracie Allen was released.
Imperial Japanese Navy Seaplane Tender Chiyoda was launched.

November 20, 1937 (Saturday)
The Chinese government moved the capital from Nanking to Chongqing.
The Japanese captured Suzhou.
Born: Ruth Laredo, classical pianist, in Detroit, Michigan (d. 2005)

November 21, 1937 (Sunday)
Lord Halifax ended his visit to Nazi Germany. He returned to London believing that Hitler could be bargained with, and this development marked the beginning of Neville Chamberlain's appeasement policy toward Germany.
Born: Ingrid Pitt, actress, in Warsaw, Poland (d. 2010); Marlo Thomas, actress, producer and social activist, in Detroit, Michigan

November 22, 1937 (Monday)
The Muslim Society of Great Britain held its first public meeting to protest the Peel Commission's recommendation to partition Palestine. Sir Ernest Nathaniel Bennett chaired the meeting.
Died: Philip de László, 68, Hungarian painter

November 23, 1937 (Tuesday)
Paul-Émile Janson became Prime Minister of Belgium.
The play Of Mice and Men, based on the John Steinbeck novel of the same name, premiered at the Music Box Theatre on Broadway.
Died: George Albert Boulenger, 79, Belgian-British zoologist; Jagadish Chandra Bose, 78, Bengali scientist; Miklós Kovács, 79, Hungarian Slovene cantor and writer

November 24, 1937 (Wednesday)
The Nine Power Treaty Conference ended with little accomplished.
British Prime Minister Neville Chamberlain responded to a question in the House of Commons about Lord Halifax's recent trip to Germany by explaining that the visit was "entirely private and unofficial" and so he would not "make any further statement in regard to them at this stage." Chamberlain called speculation in the British press about the nature of the discussions "not only irresponsible but highly inaccurate."
In Canada, the first Governor General's Awards were presented by Lord Tweedsmuir.

November 25, 1937 (Thursday)
French authorities arrested Eugène Deloncle, the alleged ringleader of the monarchist plot to overthrow the French republic.

November 26, 1937 (Friday)
The Battle of Shanghai ended in Japanese victory.
Hjalmar Schacht resigned as Reich Minister of Economics and was replaced by Hermann Göring. Schacht remained in the Cabinet as minister without portfolio.
 Robert Schumann's only Violin Concerto is premiered in Berlin, more than 80 years after it was written.
Born: Boris Yegorov, physician and cosmonaut, in Moscow, USSR (d. 1994)

November 27, 1937 (Saturday)
Anna Marie Hahn was sentenced to death.
The revue Pins and Needles premiered at the Labor Stage Theatre on Broadway.

November 28, 1937 (Sunday)
Generalissimo Francisco Franco announced a total naval blockade of Republican ports and warned that any ship attempting to enter the ports would be attacked. He also told the Republican government to surrender by December 12 or face a massive new offensive.
A referendum on freemasonry was held in Switzerland. 68.7% of voters rejected a proposed ban on the practice.
Born: Elijah Malok Aleng, public servant, general and politician, in Bor, Sudan (d. 2014)

November 29, 1937 (Monday)
Italy formally recognized Manchukuo.

November 30, 1937 (Tuesday)
Eighty-one-year-old Russian Orthodox Bishop Seraphim Chichagov was arrested by Soviet authorities on a charge of spreading monarchist propaganda.
Clint Frank of Yale University was awarded the Heisman Trophy.
Born: Ridley Scott, film director and producer, in South Shields, England
Died: Thubten Choekyi Nyima, 53 or 54, 9th Panchen Lama of Tibet

References

1937
1937-11
1937-11